The MPEG Industry Forum (MPEGIF) is a non-profit consortium dedicated to "further the adoption of MPEG Standards, by establishing them as well accepted and widely used standards among creators of content, developers, manufacturers, providers of services, and end users."

The group is involved in many tasks, including promotion of MPEG standards (particularly MPEG-4, MPEG-4 AVC / H.264, MPEG-7 and MPEG-21); developing MPEG certification for products; organising educational events; and collaborating on development of new de facto MPEG standards.

MPEGIF, founded in 2000, has played a significant role in facilitating the widespread adoption and deployment of MPEG-4 AVC/H.264 as the industry's standard video compression technology powering next generation television and most mainstream content delivery and consumption applications including packaged media. MPEGIF serves as a single point of information on technology, products and services for these standards, offers interoperability testing, a conformance program, marketing activities and is supporting over 50 international trade shows and conferences per year.

The key activities of the forum are structured via three main Committees:

 Technology & Engineering
 Interoperability & Compliance
 Marketing & Communication

2009–2010 focus areas
 3DTV
 Addressable advertising: extension and adoption of CableLabs SCTE-104 for all multimedia
 MPEG-4/Scalable Video Coding (SVC)
 Simplifying competitive licensing
 Quality of Experience / Quality of Service metrics
 Royalty free DRM initiatives
 Online Video / Internet Streaming
 IPTV ecosystem
 Ultra HD (7680x4320)
 MPEG/High-Performance Video Coding (HVC, H.265)
 MPEG-7 / MPEG-21

MPEGIF is also running the MPEGIF Logo Qualification Program, which is designed to help guide interoperability among products and technology. The program, based on a self-certification process, is free of charge and open to all companies using MPEG technology, not just members of MPEGIF although, membership is encouraged. Qualified products have the right to display the MP4 Qualification Mark and also list their status in their documentation, literature, and advertising. They will also have their product listed in the MPEGIF Product Directory.

In June 2012 the MPEG Industry Forum officially "declared victory" and voted to close its operation and merge its remaining assets with that of the Open IPTV Forum.

External links 
 site at archive.org

MPEG
Digital television
History of television
Film and video technology
Standards organizations
High-definition television
Video compression
Videotelephony